Melamphaes microps, the smalleye bigscale or smalleye ridgehead is a fish of the genus Melamphaes, found in the North Atlantic, South Atlantic, southern Indian Ocean, and the south west Pacific including New Zealand, at depths of from 1,000 to 3,000 m.  Their length is up to 10 cm.

References
 
 
Tony Ayling & Geoffrey Cox, Collins Guide to the Sea Fishes of New Zealand,  (William Collins Publishers Ltd, Auckland, New Zealand 1982) 

Melamphaidae
Fish described in 1878
Taxa named by Albert Günther